The Tatkal Scheme is a ticketing program established by Indian Railways. The scheme is used for booking journeys at very short notice. The Indian Railways introduced it in all forms of reserved classes on almost all trains in India. It was introduced in 1997, when Nitish Kumar was the Railway Minister of India. Bookings can be made online and offline.

Features
Tatkal tickets can be booked over the counter in a railway station and on the internet at  IRCTC.
 Ticket booking opens at 10:00 AM on the day before the day of the train at origin station. The day of the journey is defined as the day of chart preparation. For APP based booking TATKAL window opens 1 day in advance excluding the day of journey. If travel date is on 5th TATKAL will open in APP on 4th; on the other side, if date of journey at boarding station is 5th for the train starting at the origin station on 4th, then tatkal booking will open on 3rd.
 Booking starts at 10:00 AM for air-conditioned coaches. For non air-conditioned reserved coaches it starts from 11:00 am.
 No entire trains are defined as Tatkal trains. Unsold Tatkal tickets are released to passengers on a waiting list. Confirmed Tatkal tickets can be canceled, but no refunds are given. Tatkal tickets on the waiting list may be cancelled and refunded.
 On those trains and in those cases where the average utilization of Tatkal accommodation during the peak period of April to September is 80% and above, the Tatkal charges that are applicable during the peak period will be charged throughout the year, i.e., for both the peak and the non-peak periods.

Premium Tatkal  Booking
Premium Tatkal was introduced on October 1, 2014 covering half of the tickets on certain trains. These tickets can be purchased online only. The program began with a pilot of about 80 trains. Premium Tatkal and regular Tatkal tickets operate in the same manner but premium tatkal will cost more than twice of tatkal ticket

Fraud prevention 
Misuse of this scheme led the Ministry of Railways to change the timing of Tatkal booking in June 2015. All types of ticketing agents including IRCTC agents will now be debarred from booking non-Tatkal tickets for 30 minutes from the opening of bookings, that is from 8 am to 8.30 AM for general classes, from 10 AM onwards for Tatkal AC classes, and from 11 AM onwards for Tatkal non-AC classes.

See also

Indian Railways
IRCTC

References

External links
Indian Railways official tatkal page
Booking Tatkal Tickets Using e-Wallet Quickly

Indian Railways